Thoristella is a genus of sea snails, marine gastropod molluscs in the family Trochidae, the top snails or top shells.

Thoristella has become a synonym of Coelotrochus P. Fischer, 1879

Distribution
This genus is endemic to New Zealand.

Species
Species within the genus Thoristella include:
 Thoristella carinata Marshall, 1998: synonym of Coelotrochus carinatus (B. A. Marshall, 1998)
 Thoristella carmesina (Webster,1908): synonym of Coelotrochus carmesina (Webster, 1908)
  Thoristella chathamensis  (Hutton, 1873) : synonym of Coelotrochus chathamensis (Hutton, 1873)
 Thoristella chathamensis aucklandica (E.A.Smith,1902): synonym of Coelotrochus chathamensis aucklandica (E.A. Smith, 1902)
 Thoristella chathamensis chathamensis (Hutton,1873): synonym of Coelotrochus chathamensis (Hutton, 1873)
 Thoristella chathamensis cookiana Powell,1934: synonym of Coelotrochus chathamensis (Hutton, 1873)
 Thoristella chathamensis dunedinensis (Suter,1897): synonym of Coelotrochus chathamensis (Hutton, 1873)
 Thoristella chathamensis profunda Dell,1956: synonym of Coelotrochus chathamensis profunda Dell, 1956
 Thoristella crassicosta Powell,1937: synonym of Acremodonta crassicosta (Powell, 1937)
 Thoristella davegibbsi Marshall, 1998 : synonym of Coelotrochus davegibbsi (B. A. Marshall, 1998)
 Thoristella oppressa (Hutton,1878): synonym of Coelotrochus oppressus (B. A. Marshall, 1998)
 Thoristella polychroma  Marshall, 1998 : synonym of Coelotrochus polychroma (B. A. Marshall, 1998)
 Thoristella rex Marshall, 1998: synonym of Coelotrochus rex (B. A. Marshall, 1998)

References

 NZ Mollusca
 Powell A W B, New Zealand Mollusca, William Collins Publishers Ltd, Auckland, New Zealand 1979 
 Miller M & Batt G, Reef and Beach Life of New Zealand, William Collins (New Zealand) Ltd, Auckland, New Zealand 1973
 Williams S.T., Donald K.M., Spencer H.G. & Nakano T. (2010) Molecular systematics of the marine gastropod families Trochidae and Calliostomatidae (Mollusca: Superfamily Trochoidea). Molecular Phylogenetics and Evolution 54:783-809.

Trochidae